Baffa ( Pashto :بفه  ) is a town, a union council and capital of Tehsil Baffa Pakhal of Mansehra District in Khyber-Pakhtunkhwa,
Pakistan. It lies about 15 km north of the district capital, Mansehra.

History
Baffa may date back to or prior to Sikh rule. It was given the status of a municipality in 1873 during British rule as a principal market town in Northern Hazara and of the neighbouring independent tracts. In 1901, the population was 7,029.

A vernacular middle school was maintained by the municipality and the District board. Baffa remained the educational hub for the Pakkhal valley, Konsh valley and Siran Valley because of the accommodation facility (hostel) attached to the Government Higher Secondary School there. At that time, this was the only high school for these three big valleys. The Municipal Committee of Mansehra took credits from the Municipal Committee of Baffa to fulfill its expenditures because the Municipal Committee of Baffa's income and revenue was more than Mansehra's.

Baffa is the resting place of Mulana Ghous Hazarvi and, historically, the rallying point for Turks in the region.
Baffa Royal Family was named after their tribe. In 1996, [Aurangzeb Khan and his 2 brothers, Haroon Khan and Aslam Khan] were elected as the Royals of Baffa.

Tea Cultivation 
Tea cultivation was started for the first time in 1958 at village Baffa, district Mansehra and subsequently, in 1964 at Misriot Dam, Rawalpindi under the auspices of Pakistan Tea Board.

Location
Baffa is situated in the Pakkhal valley of Mansehra District. The town is located on the east bank of the Siran river, in the north corner of the Pakkhli plain. Travelling via the Karakorum Highway, Baffa is 13 kilometres north-west of the district capital, Mansehra.

It is the headquarters of the historical Pakkhal Valley, also known as Pakkhal Plain. This valley is the last and largest plain between Pakistan and China. Deosai National Park is the biggest plain on the Pakistan-China Himalayan frontier, covering an area of 3000 km2. Beyond the Pakkhal Valley are the world's highest mountains, the Himalayas.

The main cantonment for Turks in the region was established at the nearby village of Guli Bagh.

Attractions
Major tourist attractions include shrines and mausoleums, most notably  Nanga Baba shrine and Dewan Raja Baba Shrine. Natural tourist attractions include Sirran River, and Mount Tingalai.

Baffa is also famous for its sweetened dairy product known as "famous khoa of baffa".

Religion
Nearly the whole population is of the Sunni Muslim sect, save for a few Shia's. Many notable Ulamas live in the town who are recognised nationwide.

Demography
The ethinic groups of Baffa predominantly include the Swati(Pashtun tribe) while the minority groups include Awans, Gujjars, Darkhail and a few Turks. The total population is about 30,000. The female literacy rate for the elderly population above is 80%.

Education

Overall literacy rate in baffa has improved significantly over the past few decades and several public and private educational institutions now serve Baffa and the surrounding areas. The town has one government Higher Secondary School for boys and one for girls. For higher education, Hazara University is situated just a few kilometers away. Before partition, Baffa was an educational hub for the northern Hazara division, The Government Primary School Baffa was established in 1873, Government Middle School Baffa was established in 1906 and the Government Higher Secondary School of Baffa was established in 1934, before the partition. At that time, in the northern part of Hazara division Baffa was the only town with an intermediate level institution.

Agriculture

Baffa is an agricultural hub and is the leading town of the district in producing different crops and vegetables. Baffa grows vegetables, wheat, maize, rice, sugarcane and tobacco. The area's "Super Virginia" Tobacco is considered to be the world's second best. "Lacson Tobacco Company Limited" and "Pakistan Tobacco Company" operate in the area. Tobacco farming is tedious and risky and some families find it immoral to cultivate tobacco, so they substitute vegetables. Tomatoes, potatoes, tea and other vegetables are cultivated in large numbers. The climate of Baffa is suitable for tea farming. Research about tea production in Pakistan was initiated by a local farmer. Privately owned tea farming in Baffa began in the late 1970s. The owner of Brook Bond, one of the world's leading tea companies, visited Baffa in the early 1980s and admired the farmer's research. The Government of Pakistan established Pakistan's first tea research centre, the National Tea Research Institute (NTRI), in Baffa. Pakistan's first tea was planted at Baffa. The Agricultural Extension Department and Agricultural Research System Department are both established there.

Development

A bridge constructed by the British government in 1935 links the small town Inayat Abad to Baffa. In 2002, floods damaged it badly; however, it was reconstructed.

Little development occurred from 1995 to 2015. Despite its success as a top quality cultivator of tobacco, Baffa does not have high quality tobacco roasting facilities. Baffa was affected by the October 2005 earthquake, although less than surrounding areas.

Electricity projects were started in the mid-1950s. The telecommunication sector of Pakistan, PTCL, started service in the mid-1970s. One public hospital is there.

Local commerce is carried out in the city centre, specially commercial center Adnan Plaza nearby.

Sports
Sports activities in Baffa include football, volleyball and cricket. Every year, tournaments are held at the khair maidan ground. The most popular games are cricket and football.  Football is a  popular sport in the town and now there are almost half a dozen active football clubs in the town competing in tournaments in and out of the town.

References

Union councils of Mansehra District